Amity is an unincorporated community in Lincoln County, in the U.S. state of Georgia.

History
The community was named on account of the friendly nature of the townspeople. A post office called Amity was established in 1890, and remained in operation until 1956. The community had 51 inhabitants in 1900.

References

Unincorporated communities in Lincoln County, Georgia
Unincorporated communities in Georgia (U.S. state)